The following is a summary of the Classic 100 Chamber survey conducted by the ABC Classic FM radio station during 2008.

Survey summary

By composer
The following 36 composers were featured in the countdown:

See also
Classic 100 Countdowns

References

Official ABC Classic FM Classic 100 Chamber site

Classic 100 Countdowns (ABC)
2008 in Australian music